Greek Empire , the term depending on the era, can refer to the following Greek regimes:

Classical Greece

 Greek colonization
 Athenian Empire (The Delian League)
 Macedonian Empire

Hellenistic world
In the Hellenistic period, Greek Empire can refer to any individual or all successor states of the Diadochi:
 Ptolemaic Kingdom under Ptolemaic dynasty
 Seleucid Empire under Seleucid dynasty
 Macedonian Kingdom under Antipatrid dynasty and then Antigonid dynasty
 Thrace and Asia Minor under Lysimachus and its rump state Kingdom of Pergamon under Attalid dynasty
 Greco-Bactrian Kingdom and Indo-Greek Kingdom

Middle Ages
In the Middle Ages, Greek Empire can refer to:
 Byzantine Empire

The use of the Greek Empire to refer to the Eastern Roman Empire was very common among Enlightenment scholars, such as Montesquieu's Considerations on the Causes of the Greatness of the Romans and their Decline and Edward Gibbon's History of the Decline and Fall of the Roman Empire.

The term can also refer to any individual Byzantine successor state that was formed after the first fall of Constantinople in 1204:
 Empire of Trebizond
 Despotate of Epirus and then Empire of Thessalonica
 Empire of Nicaea

Modern 
 Kingdom of Greece and Megali Idea